Larry Robert Landreth (born March 11, 1955) is a Canadian former professional baseball player and a former pitcher in the Major Leagues who appeared in seven games for the Montreal Expos in –.

Landreth was 18 years of age when he signed with Montreal on March 28, 1973, after playing amateur baseball in his native city. He became the first baseball player from Stratford to reach the Major Leagues. In , his fourth professional season, he won 13 games for the Double-A Quebec Metros and was recalled by the parent Expos for a September trial.  In his MLB debut, on September 16 at Parc Jarry, he drew the starting assignment against the Chicago Cubs and pitched six shutout innings, allowing four hits but six bases on balls. Despite the baserunners, he left the game with a 1–0 lead and Montreal held on to win, 4–3, for Landreth's only Major League victory. Control issues plagued Landreth again in his next start six days later against the New York Mets, as he walked four in only 1 innings and allowed three earned runs; Landreth absorbed the loss as Montreal fell, 4–2.

All told, in his seven big-league games (including three other starts), Landreth allowed 29 hits and 18 bases on balls in 20 innings pitched. He continued his career in minor league baseball  through 1979.

References

External links

1955 births
Living people
Albuquerque Dukes players
Baseball people from Ontario
Canadian expatriate baseball players in the United States
Denver Bears players
Holyoke Millers players
Jamestown Expos players
Major League Baseball players from Canada
Major League Baseball pitchers
Montreal Expos players
Sportspeople from Stratford, Ontario
Québec Carnavals players
Quebec Metros players
West Palm Beach Expos players